Alkalihalobacillus clausii or its old scientific name Bacillus clausii is a rod-shaped, motile, and spore-forming bacterium that lives in the soil but is also a natural microflora of the mammalian gastrointestinal tract. It is classified as probiotic microorganism that maintains a symbiotic relationship with the host organism. It is currently being studied in relation to respiratory infections and some gastrointestinal disorders. Bacillus clausii has been found to produce antimicrobial substances that are active against gram-positive bacteria including Staphylococcus aureus, Enterococcus faecium and Clostridium difficile. It is sold as an anti-diarrhoea and under the brand name Erceflora by Sanofi. 

This species has been recently transferred into the genus Alkalihalobacillus. The correct nomenclature is thus Alkalihalobacillus clausii.

Genome structure
Alkalihalobacillus clausii has a relatively small genome that contains 4.30 Mbp with 4,108 protein coding genes.

References

External links
Bacillus clausii
Type strain of Bacillus clausii at BacDive -  the Bacterial Diversity Metadatabase

Probiotics
clausii
Bacteria described in 1995